The Kataw is one of the merfolk in the Philippine Mythology. In Visayan, Katau was believed to have higher rankings than other water and sea creatures as those of Sirena, Sireno and Siyokoy. It is believed that the Kataws are the reigning rulers of the kingdom Bantay Tubig.

Based on physical features, Kataws, along the Sireyna and Sireyno, were the Bantay Tubig-creatures that bear likeness to human while Siyokoy are those that resemble water-creatures. Unlike Sirena, they have feet instead of tails but they have gills on their bodies and fins in their arms. These marine creatures disguise themselves as fishermen asking for help. When approached by mortals, the Kataws drown them into the abyss.

According to old folks, Kataws have the ability to manipulate and control water-type elements and related forces such as pressure, tides, waves, bubbles and the likes. Also, they can change water to ice.

References

Visayan mythology
Philippine legendary creatures
Mermen
Piscine and amphibian humanoids